Rhodoplanes piscinae is a Gram-negative, rod-shaped, phototrophic, non-sulfur bacterium  from the genus of Rhodoplanes which has been isolated from a freshwater fish pond in Mangalore in India.

References

External links
Type strain of Rhodoplanes piscinae at BacDive -  the Bacterial Diversity Metadatabase

Nitrobacteraceae
Bacteria described in 2012